δ-Carotene (delta-carotene) or ε,ψ-carotene is a form of carotene with an ε-ring at one end, and the other uncyclized, labelled ψ (psi). It is an intermediate synthesis product in some photosynthetic plants between lycopene and α-carotene (β,ε-carotene) or ε-carotene (ε,ε-carotene). δ-Carotene is fat soluble. Delta-carotene contains an alpha-ionone instead of a beta-ionone ring; this conversion is carried out by the gene Del which shifts the position of the double bond in the ring structure. The formation delta-carotene under the presence of the Del gene is sensitive to high temperatures.

References 

Carotenoids
Tetraterpenes
Cyclohexenes